Vernon Township may refer to:

Illinois
 Vernon Township, Lake County, Illinois

Indiana
 Vernon Township, Hancock County, Indiana
 Vernon Township, Jackson County, Indiana
 Vernon Township, Jennings County, Indiana
 Vernon Township, Washington County, Indiana

Iowa
 Vernon Township, Dubuque County, Iowa, in Dubuque County, Iowa
 Vernon Township, Humboldt County, Iowa
 Vernon Township, Palo Alto County, Iowa
 Vernon Township, Van Buren County, Iowa
 Vernon Township, Wright County, Iowa

Kansas
 Vernon Township, Cowley County, Kansas

Michigan
 Vernon Township, Isabella County, Michigan
 Vernon Township, Shiawassee County, Michigan

Minnesota
 Vernon Township, Dodge County, Minnesota

Missouri
 Vernon Township, Clark County, Missouri

New Jersey
 Vernon Township, New Jersey

North Dakota
 Vernon Township, Kidder County, North Dakota, in Kidder County, North Dakota
 Vernon Township, Walsh County, North Dakota

Ohio
 Vernon Township, Clinton County, Ohio
 Vernon Township, Crawford County, Ohio
 Vernon Township, Scioto County, Ohio
 Vernon Township, Trumbull County, Ohio

Oklahoma
 Vernon Township, Kay County, Oklahoma

Pennsylvania
 Vernon Township, Crawford County, Pennsylvania

South Dakota
 Vernon Township, Beadle County, South Dakota, in Beadle County, South Dakota
 Vernon Township, Grant County, South Dakota, in Grant County, South Dakota

See also
Vernon (disambiguation)

Township name disambiguation pages